Agawa Canyon station (or just Canyon railway station) is a railway station at the railway point of Canyon, in the Unorganized North part of Algoma District in Ontario, Canada. It lies on the Algoma Central Railway (ACR) main line, between Frater to the south and Eton to the north, and is acts as the terminus for the Agawa Canyon Tour Train.  The Algoma Central Railway is a subsidiary of Canadian National Railway. The railway provides the option of renting a Canyon Camp Car (a former Wisconsin Central caboose) that has been refurbished for this purpose.

The Agawa Canyon Tour train that departs Sault Ste. Marie stops here for lunch ( hours during summer schedules) before returning to Sault Ste. Marie. Algoma Central passenger train service north to Hearst ended in July 2015.

References

External links

Algoma Central Railway stations
Railway stations in Algoma District